"Starving" is a song by American singer Hailee Steinfeld and American duo Grey, featuring Russian-German producer Zedd. The song was written by Grey members Michael Trewartha and Kyle Trewartha, Robert McCurdy, Christopher Petrosino, and Asia Whiteacre. It was released on July 22, 2016, through Republic Records and Universal Music Group. "Starving" is included on the Japanese edition of Steinfeld's debut extended play, Haiz (2015). It serves as the record's third and final single.

Background

In an interview with Nylons Irina Grechko, Steinfeld said "'Starving' is a song about sort of knowing someone, or getting to know that certain someone, to the point where even though you were somebody before that person came along, they have given you this whole new outlook on yourself and on life. It's this idea that since you came into my life everything is different, and I didn't know that it could be this different since you came into my life."

Critical reception
Katherine Barner of Idolator called the song "a dreamy, teen romance anthem." Teen Vogues Isis Briones said that the song "has a soft guitar start and builds up to a mellow dance tune, perfect for a low-key summer night with your best friends. Thanks to the catchy lyrics and Zedd's smooth transitions, you'll instantly pick up on all the words to the song after just listening to it a few times. There's no doubt this single will soon top the charts, so get on it early and add it to your playlist ASAP."

Chart performance
"Starving" debuted at number 96 on the Billboard Hot 100 chart dated August 20, 2016. The song rose 31–24 on the chart dated October 15, 2016, making it Steinfeld's highest-charting single to date (ahead of the number 30-peaking "Love Myself"). It reached a peak position of 12 on the chart dated December 17, 2016. "Starving" is Steinfeld's second top 40 single, Grey's first, and Zedd's fifth. On the Pop Songs chart, "Starving" debuted at number 32 on the chart dated August 13, 2016 and reached a peak position of 5 on the chart dated January 14, 2017. The song became Steinfeld's first top 10 on the chart in November 2016.

In Canada, "Starving" debuted at number 86 on the Billboard Canadian Hot 100 chart dated August 27, 2016. The song reached a peak position of 9 on the chart dated January 14, 2017, earning Steinfeld her first top 10 single in that country.

The song also charted well internationally, earning Steinfeld her first top 10 on multiple record charts. "Starving" peaked at number 5 in Australia, number 8 in Denmark, number 8 in Ireland, number 8 on the Netherlands' Dutch Top 40 chart, number 5 in New Zealand, number 3 in Scotland, and number 5 in the United Kingdom.

Music video
A music video directed by Darren Craig was released on September 27, 2016. It features Steinfeld dancing with four shirtless male back-up dancers, as well as a cameo appearance by Grey.

Charts

Weekly charts

Year-end charts

Certifications

Release history

References

2016 songs
2016 singles
Republic Records singles
Island Records singles
Hailee Steinfeld songs
Zedd songs
Songs written by Asia Whiteacre